Latin Pop Airplay is a chart published by Billboard magazine that ranks the top-performing songs (regardless of genre or language) on Latin pop radio stations in the United States, based on weekly airplay data compiled by Nielsen's Broadcast Data Systems. It is a subchart of Hot Latin Songs, which lists the best-performing Spanish-language songs in the country. In 1997, 17 songs topped the chart, in 52 issues of the magazine.

The first number one of the year was "Lloviendo Flores" by Ednita Nazario, which moved into the top spot in the issue dated January 4. It remained in place for only a single week before being replaced by "Las Cosas Que Vives" by Laura Pausini which had previously topped the chart in the week ending December 28, 1996, and spent four further weeks at number one in 1997 for a total of five. Enrique Iglesias was the artist with the most number-one songs in 1997 with "Enamorado Por Primera Vez", "Sólo en Ti" (a Spanish-language adaptation of Yazoo's "Only You"), and "Miente". The former track held this position for the longest with ten weeks. Alejandro Fernández and Luis Miguel were the only other acts to have more than one chart-topper in 1997. Fernández achieved his first number one with "Si Tú Supieras" and had the final number one of the year with "En El Jardín", a duet with Gloria Estefan. Estefan herself obtained her second number one with "No Pretendo".

Luis Miguel spent a total of six weeks at number one with "Por Debajo de la Mesa" and "El Reloj", the former of which was named the best-performing song of the year. "El Reloj", "Si Tú Supieras", and Cristian Castro's "Lo Mejor de Mi" were cited by Reforma when the newspaper described 1997 as the year of the bolero due to the songs' popularity. Celine Dion recorded a Spanish-language version of Eric Carmen's "All by Myself" under the title "Sola Otra Vez" which became her first number one song on the chart. Other artists to top the chart for the first time in 1997 were Ricardo Montaner, Marta Sánchez, and Diego Torres, while Fey obtained her first and only chart-topper this year with "Azúcar Amargo".

Chart history

See also
1997 in Latin music

References

United States Latin Pop Airplay
1997
1997 in Latin music
1997 in American music